Park Byung-gyu (born March 1, 1982) is a South Korean football player. He played for Ulsan Hyundai FC and Gwangju Sangmu FC previously.

References

External links

1982 births
Living people
South Korean footballers
K League 1 players
Ulsan Hyundai FC players
Gimcheon Sangmu FC players
Korea University alumni
Association football defenders